St Agnes' Church, Freshwater is a parish church in the Church of England located in Freshwater, Isle of Wight.

History

The church dates from 1908 and is by the architect Isaac Jones, who lived from 7 November 1850 until 25 November 1917.

Tennyson's son, Hallam donated land for a new church in Freshwater Bay. Hallam's wife Audrey suggested that the church be named for St Agnes. St Agnes Church was consecrated 12 August 1908. It is the only thatched church on the Isle of Wight.

The stone used to build the Church came from an old and derelict farm house on Hooke Hill, Freshwater, and the date stone 1622 [sic] was incorporated into the vestry wall, thus rather misleading those who may think the Church belonged to the 17th century".

Parish status

The church is in a united parish with All Saints' Church, Freshwater.

Organ

A specification of the organ can be found on the National Pipe Organ Register.

Gallery

References

Church of England church buildings on the Isle of Wight
Grade II listed churches on the Isle of Wight